Radio Unsko-sanskog kantona or Radio USK is a Bosnian local public radio station, broadcasting from Bihać, Bosnia and Herzegovina and it broadcasts a variety of programs such as news, music, morning and talk shows. Program is operated by RTV USK and it is mainly produced in Bosnian language.

Radio Unsko-sanskog kantona was launched on 15 August 1996 as regional (Canton) public radio station in Una-Sana Canton.

Estimated number of potential listeners of Radio Unsko-sanskog kantona in Una-Sana Canton and Bosanska Krajina area is around 403.850.

Due to the favorable geographical position in Bosanska Krajina area, this radiostation is also available in neighboring Croatia. Radio USK is also available via internet and via IPTV platforms in BiH (Moja TV - Channel 182).

Mix Shows 

 A State of Trance - Internationally recognized mix show hosted by Armin van Buuren and Reuben de Rondé (Monday nights at 23h)
 Transitions - hosted by John Digweed (Friday nights at 22h)
 Tiësto's Club Life - hosted by veteran DJ Tiësto (Friday at 23h)
 In The Mood - hosted by Lebanese-Nigerian DJ Nicole Moudaber
 Planet Perfecto - hosted by Paul Oakenfold
 Nuvolve Radio - UK garage mix show hosted by DJ EZ
 UMF Radio - hosted by RioTGeaR
 Spinnin' Sessions

Frequencies

The program of Radio USK is currently broadcast at 6 frequencies:
 Kulen Vakuf 
 Bosanski Petrovac 
 Bihać 
 Sanski Most 
 Cazin

Radio USK 2
Radio USK 2 is internet radio streaming service.

See also 
List of radio stations in Bosnia and Herzegovina
Radio Bihać
Radio Bosanski Petrovac
Radio Bosanska Krupa
Radio Sana
Radio Ključ
Radio Velika Kladuša

References

External links 
 www.rtvusk.ba
 www.vladausk.ba
 Communications Regulatory Agency of Bosnia and Herzegovina

Bihać
Radio stations established in 1996
Bihać